Danielle Yvonne Marie Antoinette Darrieux (1 May 1917 – 17 October 2017) was a French actress of stage, television and film, as well as a singer and dancer.

Beginning in 1931, she appeared in more than 110 films. She was one of France's great movie stars and her eight-decade career was among the longest in film history.

Life and career

Darrieux was born in Bordeaux, France, during World War I, the daughter of Marie-Louise (Witkowski) and Jean Darrieux, a medical doctor who was serving in the French Army. Her mother was born in Algeria. Her father died when she was seven years old.

Raised in Paris, she studied the cello at the Conservatoire de Musique. At 14, she won a part in the musical film Le Bal (1931). Her beauty combined with her singing and dancing ability led to numerous other offers; the film Mayerling (1936) brought her to prominence.

In 1935, Darrieux married director/screenwriter Henri Decoin, who encouraged her to try Hollywood. She signed a seven-year contract with Universal Studios to star in The Rage of Paris (1938) opposite Douglas Fairbanks, Jr. Afterwards, she elected to return to Paris.

Under the German occupation of France during World War II, Darrieux continued to perform, a decision that was severely criticized by her compatriots. However, it is reported that her brother had been threatened with deportation by Alfred Greven, the German manager of Continental, the only film production company permitted in occupied France. She received a divorce and then fell in love with Porfirio Rubirosa, a Dominican Republic diplomat and notorious womanizer. They married in 1942. His anti-Nazi opinions resulted in his forced residence in Germany. In exchange for Rubirosa's freedom, Darrieux agreed to make a promotional trip in Berlin. The couple lived in Switzerland until the end of the war, and divorced in 1947. She married scriptwriter Georges Mitsikidès in 1948, and they lived together until his death in 1991.
 
Darrieux appeared in the MGM musical Rich, Young and Pretty (1951). Joseph L. Mankiewicz lured her back to Hollywood to star in 5 Fingers (1952) with James Mason. Upon returning to France, she appeared in Max Ophüls' The Earrings of Madame de... (1953) with Charles Boyer, and The Red and the Black (1954) with Gérard Philippe. She starred in Lady Chatterley's Lover (1955), whose theme of uninhibited sexuality led to its being proscribed by Catholic censors in the United States. She played a supporting role in her last American film, United Artists' epic Alexander the Great (1956) starring Richard Burton and Claire Bloom.

At the request of director Lewis Gilbert, Darrieux worked in England to shoot The Greengage Summer (1961) with Kenneth More. In 1963, she starred in the romantic comedy La Robe Mauve de Valentine at the Chatelet Theatre in Paris. The play was adapted from the novel by Françoise Sagan.

In Jacques Demy's film musical The Young Girls of Rochefort (1966) her role was the only one in which a principal actor in any of Demy's film-musicals sang his or her own musical parts. (All other actors had a separate person dub their singing parts.) During the 1960s, she also was a concert singer.

In 1970, Darrieux replaced Katharine Hepburn in the Broadway musical Coco, based on the life of Coco Chanel, but the play, essentially a showcase for Hepburn, soon folded without her. In 1971 and 1972 she also appeared in the short-lived productions of Ambassador. She worked again with Demy for his film Une chambre en ville (1982), an opera-like musical melodrama reminiscent of the director's earlier work The Umbrellas of Cherbourg (Les Parapluies de Cherbourg, 1964). Once again, Darrieux provided her own vocals for her songs.

Honors
For her long service to the motion picture industry, in 1985 she was given an Honorary César Award. She continued to work, her career spanning eight decades, most recently providing the voice of the protagonist's grandmother in the animated feature Persepolis (2007), which deals with the impact of the Islamic revolution on a girl's life as she grows to adulthood in Iran.

Death
Danielle Darrieux died on 17 October 2017, due to complications from a fall, five months after turning 100 that May.

Filmography

Awards

References

Bibliography

External links

 

Danielle Darrieux at filmsdefrance.com
Photographs of Danielle Darrieux
L'Encinémathèque at Encinémathèque 
Danielle Darrieux(Aveleyman)

1917 births
2017 deaths
French centenarians
French film actresses
French stage actresses
French women singers
French television actresses
Actresses from Bordeaux
European Film Award for Best Actress winners
Commandeurs of the Légion d'honneur
César Honorary Award recipients
20th-century French actresses
21st-century French actresses
Officiers of the Ordre des Arts et des Lettres
Accidental deaths from falls
French expatriate actresses in the United States
Women centenarians